Patrick K. "Pat" McGowan is an American politician from Maine. McGowan, a Democrat, served in the Clinton administration as the New England regional administrator of the Small Business Administration. From 2003 to 2010, he served as Maine's Commissioner of Conservation. In 2010, he unsuccessfully sought the Democratic Party's nomination for Governor.

The Pittsfield, Maine native began his political career with his election in 1980 to the Maine House of Representatives where he served for ten years. He ran as the Democratic nominee for Maine's 2nd congressional district seat in 1990 and 1992. Both times, he nearly defeated incumbent Republican Olympia Snowe.

McGowan served as the Maine Commissioner of Conservation from 2003 to 2010. The Portland Press Herald endorsed McGowan for the Democratic Party's nomination for Governor. McGowan lost the primary to Libby Mitchell.

References

He has four kids one of them is very special her name is Amelia.

Year of birth missing (living people)
Living people
Democratic Party members of the Maine House of Representatives
People from Kennebec County, Maine
Politicians from Bangor, Maine
Small Business Administration personnel
State cabinet secretaries of Maine
University of Maine at Farmington alumni